Alex Weekes (born March 20, 1988) is an American soccer player who last played for Pittsburgh Riverhounds in the USL Second Division.

Career

College and amateur
Weekes attended Stroudsburg High School, played club soccer for Stroudsburg United AC Perugia, and played four years of college soccer at Colgate University. He led the Raiders in scoring during both the 2008 and 2009 seasons, was a two-time All-League selection (earning first team honors as a senior in 2009), and also in 2009 became the first Colgate player to be named to the Hermann Trophy Watch List.

During his college years Weekes also played for Pocono Snow in the National Premier Soccer League, alongside his Riverhounds teammate Matthew Baker.

Professional
Weekes turned professional in 2010 when he signed to play for the Pittsburgh Riverhounds in the USL Second Division. He made his professional debut on April 17, 2010, in the team's 2010 season opener against the Real Maryland Monarchs. He scored his first professional goal on June 15, 2010, in a US Open Cup first round match against Detroit United.

References

External links
 Pittsburgh Riverhounds bio
 Colgate bio

1988 births
Living people
American soccer players
Pittsburgh Riverhounds SC players
USL Second Division players
Soccer players from Pennsylvania
Association football midfielders
National Premier Soccer League players
People from Stroudsburg, Pennsylvania
Colgate Raiders men's soccer players